Helen Frye or Fry may refer to:
Helen Fisher Frye (1918–2014), American educator and civil rights activist
Helen J. Frye (1930–2011), American judge
Helen Frye (writer), British writer and poet, see 1970 in literature
Helen Varner Vanderbilt Frye (1908–1979), American and former wife to Cornelius Vanderbilt IV and Jack Frye
Helen Kemp Frye (1910–1986) Canadian educator, editor and artist, first wife of Northrop Frye
Helen Fry (born 1967), historian
Helen Fry, a song on The Felice Brothers (album)